Lamiskos (4th century BC) was an ancient Greek philosopher. Born in Tarentum, Lamiskos was a follower of the Pythagorean philosopher Archytas. Around 360 BC, when Plato was imprisoned by Dionysius the Younger, Archytas sent Lamiskos to secure his release.

References 

4th-century BC philosophers
Classical Greek philosophers
Ancient Tarantines